Nader George Shalhoub (born 6 July 1947) is a Jordanian sports shooter. He competed in the mixed trap event at the 1980 Summer Olympics.

References

External links
 

1947 births
Living people
Jordanian male sport shooters
Olympic shooters of Jordan
Shooters at the 1980 Summer Olympics
Place of birth missing (living people)
20th-century Jordanian people